General elections were held in Guyana on 16 December 1968. The result was a victory for the People's National Congress, which won 30 of the 53 seats, although the PNC's victory was the result of fraud as the government had direct control of the elections. Voter turnout was 85.1%.

Election fraud
The electoral fraud of Forbes Burnham was the subject of two documentaries produced by Granada Television, The Trail of the Vanishing Voters which aired on 9 December 1968, and The Making of a Prime Minister which appeared in January 1969. The documentaries featured the main opposition figures, Cheddi Jagan and Peter D'Aguiar.

Results

References

Guyana
1968 in Guyana
Elections in Guyana
December 1968 events in South America